Maddington Station is a railway station on the Transperth network. It is located on the Armadale Line, 17.7 kilometres from Perth Station serving the suburb of Maddington.

History
From 26 December 1895 until February 1952, Maddington was the junction for a 700-metre branch line to Canning Racecourse.

In 2013, a major upgrade was completed to the station.

Services
Maddington station is served by Transperth Armadale Line services.

The station saw 334,839 passengers in the 2013-14 financial year.

Platforms

Bus routes

References

Armadale and Thornlie lines
Railway stations in Perth, Western Australia